Sylphide might refer to: 
La Sylphide, a ballet choreographed by Filippo Taglioni in 1832 and by August Bournonville in 1836
Les Sylphides, a ballet choreographed by Mikhail Fokine in 1909
Sylphide, a cheese owned by Bel Group